Systema Solar is a Colombian dance music group known for their party-oriented sound, which is influenced by the sound system DJ culture of the Caribbean. Their music combines elements of Caribbean music, champeta, bullerengue and cumbia, among other genres.

History
Systema Solar originated in 2006, when DJ Vanessa Gocksch offered to create a band to play at an Art Biennial festival in Medellín, Colombia. Soon afterward, the hastily assembled septet made its debut performance in front of an audience of several thousand people. In 2009, their self-titled album was released, and the following year, it was re-released on Chusma Records. An expanded version of this album was later released by Nacional Records in March 2016, featuring tracks from a previous album they had released in 2013. In 2017, they released the album Rumbo a Tierra. As of 2017, the group had six members.

Critical reception
Rolling Stone named the 2016 reissue of Systema Solar the third best Latin album of 2016, writing, "Vibrant and demanding, the Colombian psychedelic soundsystem champions the causes of immigrants and POC while commanding bystanders to get rowdy on the dance floor."

NPR's Jessica Diaz-Hurtado wrote that Rumbo a Tierra "...takes listeners on a colorful and politically urgent journey", describing it as "a protest album that never lets its innovation stand in the way of its forcefulness." Ryan Patrick gave the album an 8 out of 10 rating in Exclaim!, writing that "Systema Solar bring a "party with a message" mentality that melds future and folk sounds with innovative flair."

Discography
Systema Solar (2009)
La Revancha Del Burro (2013)
Rumbo A Tierra (2017)

Awards and nominations

References

External links

2006 establishments in Colombia
Musical groups established in 2006
Colombian cumbia musical groups
Sextets
Nacional Records artists
Musical collectives
Colombian dance music groups
Colombian hip hop groups
Afro-Caribbean music